Dangerous Turning (French: Le tournant dangereux) is a 1954 French-Italian drama film directed by Robert Bibal and starring Viviane Romance, Philippe Lemaire and Armand Mestral.

Cast
 Viviane Romance as Lucienne Courtois 
 Philippe Lemaire as Freddy 
 Armand Mestral as Daniel Courtois 
 Maria Pia Casilio as Paquita Simoni 
 Enrico Glori as Simoni, le brigadier 
 Guy Decomble as Monsieur Léon 
 Georges Aminel
 Charles Blavette
 Dany Caron
 Robert Berri
 Huguette Doriane
 Henri Arius
 Antonin Berval

References

Bibliography 
 Chiti, Roberto & Poppi, Roberto. Dizionario del cinema italiano: Dal 1945 al 1959. Gremese Editore, 1991.

External links 
 

1954 films
French drama films
Italian drama films
1954 drama films
1950s French-language films
Films directed by Robert Bibal
French black-and-white films
Italian black-and-white films
1950s French films
1950s Italian films
French-language Italian films